Motala Motor Museum is a museum in Motala harbour, Sweden. Over 200 vehicles; cars, mopeds, bicycles and 300 radios and TVs are displayed.

External links
http://www.motormuseum.se

Automobile museums in Sweden
Telecommunications museums
Museums in Östergötland County